In mathematics, the 11-cell (or hendecachoron) is a self-dual abstract regular 4-polytope (four-dimensional polytope). Its 11 cells are hemi-icosahedral. It has 11 vertices, 55 edges and 55 faces. It has Schläfli symbol {3,5,3}, with 3 hemi-icosahedra (Schläfli type {3,5}) around each edge.

It has symmetry order 660, computed as the product of the number of cells (11) and the symmetry of each cell (60). The symmetry structure is the abstract group projective special linear group L2(11).

It was discovered in 1977 by Branko Grünbaum, who constructed it by pasting hemi-icosahedra together, three at each edge, until the shape closed up. It was independently discovered by H. S. M. Coxeter in 1984, who studied its structure and symmetry in greater depth.

Related polytopes
Orthographic projection of 10-simplex with 11 vertices, 55 edges.

The abstract 11-cell contains the same number of vertices and edges as the 10-dimensional 10-simplex, and contains 1/3 of its 165 faces. Thus it can be drawn as a regular figure in 10-space, although then its hemi-icosahedral cells are skew; that is, each cell is not contained within a flat 3-dimensional subspace.

See also 
 5-simplex
 57-cell
 Icosahedral honeycomb - regular hyperbolic honeycomb with same Schläfli symbol {3,5,3}. (The 11-cell can be considered to be derived from it by identification of appropriate elements.)

References 
 Peter McMullen, Egon Schulte, Abstract Regular Polytopes, Cambridge University Press, 2002. 
 Coxeter, H.S.M., A Symmetrical Arrangement of Eleven hemi-Icosahedra, Annals of Discrete Mathematics 20 pp103–114.
 The Classification of Rank 4 Locally Projective Polytopes and Their Quotients, 2003, Michael I Hartley

External links
 J. Lanier, Jaron’s World. Discover, April 2007, pp 28-29.
  2007 ISAMA paper: Hyperseeing the Regular Hendecachoron, Carlo H. Séquin & Jaron Lanier, Also Isama 2007, Texas A&m hyper-Seeing the Regular Hendeca-choron. (= 11-Cell)
 

4-polytopes